Cantikus v-notatus is a species of spider in the family Pholcidae. It is found from Myanmar to Indonesia.

Taxonomy
The species was originally described by Tamerlan Thorell in 1878 as Pholcus v-notatus, the "v" referring to the shape of the mark on the cephalothorax. Thorell wrote "", 'marked with black ∧ in thoracic part'. In 2011, Huber published a classification of the family Pholcidae in which he used the specific name "quinquenotatus" for this species, expanding Thorell's "v" to the Latin word for five (V being 5 in Roman numerals). The same version of the specific name was used when the species was transferred to the new genus Cantikus in 2018 as a result of further molecular phylogenetic analysis. The World Spider Catalog uses Thorell's original form of the name, noting that the "v" refers to a mark, and so not to the numeral.

See also 
 List of Pholcidae species

References

Pholcidae
Spiders of Asia
Spiders described in 1878